Edward Thomson (October 12, 1810 – March 21, 1870) was an American Bishop of the Methodist Episcopal Church (and therefore also of the United Methodist Church), elected in 1864.

Early life
Thomson was born in Portsea, part of Portsmouth, England. When he was seven years old his family emigrated to the United States, settling in Wooster, Ohio.

His father, a pharmacist, influenced Edward toward the study of medicine, which he pursued at the University of Pennsylvania.  He united with the M.E. Church April 29, 1832, and was licensed as an exhorter the next year.  Indiana Asbury (now DePauw) University gave him the degree of D.D. in 1846, and Ohio Wesleyan that of LL.D. in 1855.

Ordained ministry

The following July, Thomson was recommended for admission to the Ohio Annual Conference, and he was received "on trial" that September.  He was appointed junior preacher on the Norwalk Circuit.  His great abilities were apparent almost immediately.  In 1836 he was appointed to Detroit in the Michigan Annual Conference (the northern part of Ohio then being a part of the Michigan Conference).  Lewis Cass, Governor of Michigan, though a Presbyterian, was among Rev. Thomson's parishioners.  While at Detroit, Thomson married a daughter of Mordecai Bartley, a U.S. congressman and later also a governor.

In 1837 Thomson became the principal of the Norwalk Seminary, where his success was so great that in 1843 he was offered the chancellorship of the University of Michigan and the presidency of Transylvania College.  In 1844 Edward was elected by the M.E. General Conference as the editor of the Ladies' Repository, an important denominational periodical.  He was re-elected to this post in 1848, but instead was called to the presidency of Ohio Wesleyan University, a post he held until 1860.  He was elected editor of the Christian Advocate in 1860, remaining until 1864 despite much opposition.

Episcopal ministry

Elected to the episcopacy in 1864, Bishop Thomson continued in this office until his death.  He likewise attained high rank as a lecturer and an editor, writing much for periodicals and papers.  He was a profound student, though absent-minded, preferring the seclusion of a college to the episcopal "office."  Notwithstanding, he was among the most eminent of bishops of that time.

Thomson died  in Wheeling, West Virginia. He was buried at Oak Grove Cemetery in Delaware, Ohio.

Selected writings
Educational Essays (new edition), Cincinnati, 1856.
Moral and Religious Essays, 1856.
Biographical and Incidental Sketches, 1856.
Letters from Europe, 1856.
Letters from India, China, and Turkey, (2 vols.), 1870.
Our Oriental Missions, 1870.

See also
List of bishops of the United Methodist Church

References

Leete, Frederick DeLand, Methodist Bishops.  Nashville, The Methodist Publishing House, 1948.

External links

1810 births
1870 deaths
American essayists
American letter writers
19th-century American memoirists
Christian writers
American Methodist bishops
American religion academics
American theologians
Bishops of the Methodist Episcopal Church
Editors of Christian publications
Methodist writers
Perelman School of Medicine at the University of Pennsylvania alumni
People from Portsea, Portsmouth
English emigrants to the United States
People from Wooster, Ohio
Burials at Oak Grove Cemetery, Delaware, Ohio
19th-century American clergy